F*ck Love (stylised in all caps) is the debut mixtape by Australian rapper and singer the Kid Laroi. It was released on 24 July 2020 by Grade A Productions and Columbia Records. Production was handled by twenty-one record producers  over the course of the mixtape's four releases, including Benny Blanco, Bobby Raps, Cashmere Cat and Taz Taylor. The original tracklist features guest appearances from Lil Mosey, Corbin Smidzik, and the late Juice Wrld.

According to a description by Apple Music, the record focuses on  "...the messy breakdown of a destructive relationship that didn't sound too great to start with."

A reissue of the mixtape, titled F*ck Love (Savage), was released on 6 November 2020, with appearances from Machine Gun Kelly, Marshmello, Internet Money and Youngboy Never Broke Again.

Another reissue of the mixtape, titled F*ck Love 3: Over You, was released on 23 July 2021, with appearances from Polo G, Stunna Gambino, Justin Bieber, G Herbo, Lil Durk, and Mustard, as well as a deluxe edition titled F*ck Love 3+: Over You, released on 27 July 2021.

F*ck Love received a nomination for Best Hip Hop Release at the 2020 ARIA Music Awards. It reached number one on the Australian ARIA album chart in February 2021, making the Kid Laroi the youngest Australian solo artist to reach number one on the chart.

Artwork 
The Guilty Crown inspired cover art, which depicts Laroi and his unnamed lover in an anime styled metropolitan city, was made by anime artist Richard Ticas, and was unveiled a week ahead of the mixtape's release.

Singles
The mixtape was preceded by two singles: "Go", and "Tell Me Why", with the former song featuring the late Juice Wrld, who was also the Kid Laroi's mentor before his passing. "Need You Most (So Sick)" was sent to Australian contemporary hit radio as the third single in August 2020.

Commercial performance
In Australia, F*ck Love debuted at number three on the ARIA chart. In its 28th week in February 2021, the album reached number one, and at 17 years, 5 months and 22 days, the Kid Laroi became the youngest Australian solo artist to hit number one on the ARIA album chart and the second male indigenous solo artist to top the chart after Geoffrey Gurrumul Yunupingu.

In the United States, F*ck Love debuted at number eight on the Billboard 200 chart, earning 40,000 album-equivalent units (including 7,000 copies as pure album sales) in its first week. The album became Laroi's first US top-ten debut. The album also accumulated at total of 49.39 million on-demand streams of the album's songs that week.

Following the release of F*ck Love (Savage) , the project reached a new peak of number three, earning 52,000 equivalent album units.

Following the release of F*ck Love 3: Over You, the third release of the mixtape, it reached a new peak of number one on the Billboard 200, jumping 25 spots on the chart with 85,000 album equivalent units, becoming Laroi's first chart-topping project in the United States.

Reissues
A reissue of the mixtape was released on 6 November 2020. Titled F*ck Love (Savage), it includes seven new songs, including the previously released single "So Done", as well as appearances from YoungBoy Never Broke Again, Internet Money, Marshmello, and Machine Gun Kelly. The release was accompanied with a music video for the track "Always Do". According to Triple J, the release of F*ck Love (Savage) is an opposite to the original mixtape; "where the original mixtape had Laroi focusing on love and loss, the new material featured here sees him coming from a different space, reflecting the personal changes he's undergone in the last year".

Another reissue of the mixtape was released on 23 July 2021. Titled F*ck Love 3: Over You, it includes seven new songs, including the previously released single "Stay" alongside Justin Bieber, as well as appearances from Polo G, Stunna Gambino, G Herbo, Lil Durk, and Mustard. The release was accompanied with a music video for the track "Not Sober". As the title suggests, Over You has Laroi focusing on moving on from his previous relationships and beginning a new one. The deluxe edition named F*ck Love 3+: Over You which featured six additional tracks, was released on 27 July 2021.

Track listing
Credits adapted from Tidal.

Notes
 All tracks are stylized in all caps

Charts

Weekly charts

Year-end charts

Certifications

References

External links
 

2020 mixtape albums
Debut mixtape albums
The Kid Laroi albums
Albums produced by Benny Blanco
Albums produced by Bobby Raps
Albums produced by Cashmere Cat
Albums produced by Dr. Luke
Albums produced by FnZ
Albums produced by Happy Perez
Albums produced by Joy (Australian musician)
Albums produced by Marshmello
Albums produced by Omer Fedi
Albums produced by Taz Taylor (record producer)
Albums produced by the Kid Laroi
Albums produced by Scott Storch
Columbia Records albums